Priestess of Avalon is a 2000 novel by American writer Marion Zimmer Bradley, completed posthumously by Diana L. Paxson. It follows detailing the life of Helena, first wife of Western Roman Emperor Constantius Chlorus and mother of Constantine.

Plot summary
The novel begins by showing her birth, with a druid giving a prophecy of her life.  It proceeds to show her as a young girl named Eilan, who becomes a priestess on the Isle of Avalon.
 
As a young woman, the British priestess Eilan, known to the Romans as Helena, falls in love with the charismatic Roman Constantius. The Roman noble takes her away from Avalon as she is banished for this forbidden love and, before long, Helena bears him a son, who will become Constantine the Great.

Helena's position in Roman society now gives her the freedom to travel about in the empire. When her son Constantine becomes Emperor, she slowly discovers brand-new roles. She faces the spread of the new Christian religion and seeks to understand the old knowledge of the goddess in light of the new religion. As Empress-Mother, Helena travels on a pilgrimage to the Holy Land to find the answers to questions that arise between the old religion and the new.

Characters

Eilan [Julia Coelia Helena, later, Flavia Helena Augusta] – the priestess of the story, protagonist. She is the daughter of Prince Coelius, consort of Constantius, mother of Constantine, and priestess of Avalon
Constantius – the Roman noble she marries
Constantine – Eilan's (Helena's) son, Emperor AD 306-37
Aelia – a young priestess, trained with Helena
Arganax - Arch-Druid during Helena's youth.
Atticus – Constantine's Greek tutor
Ceridachos – Arch-Druid when Dierna becomes High Priestess 
Cigfolla – a priestess of Avalon
Julius Colius [King Coel] – Prince of Camulodunum, father of Helena
Corinthius the Elder – Helena's tutor
Corinthius the Younger – master of a school in Londinium
Crispus – Constantine's illegitimate son by Minervina
Cunoarda – Helena's Alban slave
Dierna – Helena's second cousin, later Lady of Avalon
Drusilla – cook in Helena and Constantius's household
Fausta – daughter of Maximian, wife of Constantine, and mother of his legitimate children
Flavius Pollio – a kinsman of Constantius
Ganeda – Helena's aunt, Lady of Avalon
Gwenna – a maiden being trained on Avalon
Haggaia – Arch-Druid when Helena returns to Avalon
Helena the Younger ("Lena") – a noblewomen of Treveri, wife of Crispus 
Heron – a maiden being trained on Avalon
Hrodlind – Helena's German maid
Katiya – a priestess of Bast in Londinium
Lactantius – a rhetorician and Christian apologist, tutor to Crispus
Lucius Viducius - a pottery merchant trading between Gallia and Eburacum
Macarius - Bishop of Jerusalem
Marcia - midwife who delivers Constantine
Martha - a Syrian slave, healed by Helena
Maxentius - son of Maximian, Augustus in Italy and North Africa 
Minervina - Constantine's Syrian concubine, mother of Crispus
Philip - Constantine's Servant
Quintillus - brother of the Emperor Claudius II, Constantius's great uncle
Rain - High Priestess of Avalon, Helena's mother
Severus - Caesar appointed by Galerius, executed by Maximian
Sian - daughter of Ganeda, mother of Dierna and Becca
Suona - a young priestess of Avalon
Victorinus - rebel Emperor in the West, AD 268-70
Vitellia - a Christian matron living in Londinium
Wren - a maiden being trained on Avalon

Release details
2000, UK, Voyager , Pub date 6 November 2000, hardback (First edition)
2001, USA, Viking Books , Pub date ? May 2001, hardback
2001, USA, Penguin Group , Pub date ? May 2001, audio cassette
2001, UK, Voyager , Pub date 21 May 2001, paperback
2002, USA, Roc , Pub date ? July 2002, paperback

Reception
Publishers Weekly praised the novel, and wrote that "Paxson's own skill at bringing historical characters and places to vivid life enriches Helena's story. This final book in the Bradley canon is sure to please her devotees and win her more."

References

Sources
 

2000 American novels
2000 fantasy novels
American fantasy novels
American historical novels
Avalon Series
Voyager Books books
Collaborative novels
Modern Arthurian fiction
Novels by Marion Zimmer Bradley
Novels published posthumously
Helena, mother of Constantine I